United Cellars is an independent fine wine and spirits merchant located in Australia, New Zealand, and Canada. The company specialises in retailing premium wines and spirits from Australia, New Zealand, Europe, and the Americas, including En Primeur wine futures from Bordeaux and Burgundy, France. United's bespoke wine advisory service called "Cellar Angels" provides its customers with a wine concierge service with access to rare, and fine wines from wine-producing regions around the world.

History 
United Cellars was established in 2004 by Anthony Ghattas as part of the United Lifestyle Group (ULG). The United Lifestyle Group has three divisions: United Cellars Australia and United Cellars New Zealand, United Galleries, and United Networks.

United Cellars Australia was voted winner of Best Independent Online Wine Retailer award for 2013 by The Wine Rules.

Markets 
United Cellars has offices in Sydney and Auckland, and in late 2012 opened an office in Vancouver, British Columbia, Canada. The company primarily sells in the Australian and New Zealand markets. It offers its customers worldwide delivery including bonded storage facilities in Bordeaux, France. It also offers local wine storage options to its Australian and New Zealand customers.  The company also hosts wine events in Sydney, Melbourne, Brisbane, Perth, Auckland, Wellington, and Hong Kong.

References

External links 
 United Cellars Australia official site
 United Cellars New Zealand official site

Wine retailers
Drink companies of Australia
Food and drink companies established in 2004
Retail companies established in 2004
2004 establishments in Australia